Elections were held in the Cordillera Administrative Region for seats in the House of Representatives of the Philippines on May 13, 2013.

The candidate with the most votes won that district's seat for the 16th Congress of the Philippines.

Summary

Abra
Ma. Jocelyn Valera-Bernos is the incumbent.

Apayao
Eleanor Bulut-Begtang is the incumbent.

Baguio
Bernardo Vergara is the incumbent.

Benguet
Ronald Cosalan is the incumbent.

Ifugao
Teodoro B. Baguilat Jr. is the incumbent.

Kalinga
Manuel Agyao is the incumbent.

Mountain Province
Maximo Dalog is the incumbent.

 
 
 
 
 
 
 

2013 Philippine general election
Lower house elections in the Cordillera Administrative Region